is the common name for , a small uninhabited islet off the coast of Shirahama,  Wakayama Prefecture, Japan. It is noted for having a natural arch created through the effects of erosion by wind and waves, and has been designated a National Place of Scenic Beauty.

The circular moon-shaped hole (sea cave) in the center of the island has a diameter of nine meters and is the origin of the popular name "Engetsu" (full moon). During the spring and autumn equinoxes, the sunset can be seen through the hole in the center.

Compared to the nearby Shirarahama Beach, water transparency is much higher near the islet and many fish species can be seen.  The island is largely formed of sandstone and has become less stable over time.  Since July 2009, the Shirahama town government has cautioned against approaching the island because of the risk of collapse of the arch.

See also
 List of Places of Scenic Beauty of Japan (Wakayama)

References

External links

Wakayama Official Visitor's Guide
Nano-Shirahama Tourist Association

Uninhabited islands of Japan
Natural arches
Places of Scenic Beauty
Landforms of Wakayama Prefecture
Rock formations of Japan
Shirahama, Wakayama